Christian Mawissa Elebi (born 18 April 2005) is a French professional footballer who plays as a defender for Toulouse.

Club career
Mawissa is a youth product of FC Pays d'Olmes, FC Mirepoix, FC Coussatois, FC Coussa Hers, and Toulouse. He began his senior career with the reserves of Toulouse in 2022. On 12 November 2022, he signed his first professional contract with Toulouse for 3 years. He made his professional debut with them in a 6–1 Ligue 1 loss to Marseille on 29 December 2022.

International career
Born in France, Mawissa is of Congolese descent. He is a youth international for France. He helped the France U17s win the 2022 UEFA European Under-17 Championship.

Honours
France U17
UEFA European Under-17 Championship: 2022

References

External links
 
 FFF profile

2005 births
Living people
Sportspeople from Ariège (department)
French sportspeople of Democratic Republic of the Congo descent
French footballers
Association football defenders
France youth international footballers
Ligue 1 players
Championnat National 3 players
Toulouse FC players